Albert Lester Lehninger (February 17, 1917 – March 4, 1986) was an American biochemist in the field of bioenergetics. He made fundamental contributions to the current understanding of metabolism at a molecular level. In 1948, he discovered, with Eugene P. Kennedy, that mitochondria are the site of oxidative phosphorylation in eukaryotes, which ushered in the modern study of energy transduction. He is the author of a number of classic texts, including: Biochemistry, The Mitochondrion, Bioenergetics  and, most notably, his series Principles of Biochemistry. The latter is a widely used text for introductory biochemistry courses at the college and university levels.

Early life and education 
Lehninger was born in Bridgeport, Connecticut, US. He earned his BA in English from Wesleyan University (1939) and went on to earn both his MA (1940) and PhD (1942) at the University of Wisconsin–Madison. His doctoral research involved the metabolism of acetoacetate and fatty acid oxidation by liver cells.

Academic career 
After earning his doctorate in biochemistry, Lehninger held various faculty positions at the University of Wisconsin–Madison and the University of Chicago. In 1952, he went to the Johns Hopkins School of Medicine, assuming the title of DeLamar Professor of the Department of Biological Chemistry. He served in this position until 1978, when he was appointed to the role of University Professor of Medical Sciences. He held this title until his death in 1986.

Honors and awards 
 1948 – Paul-Lewis Award in Enzyme Chemistry
 1951 – Guggenheim Fellowship
 1956 – Elected to the National Academy of Sciences
 1959 – Elected to the American Academy of Arts and Sciences
 1969 – Remsen Award of the American Chemical Society
 1970 – American Philosophical Society
 1986 – Passano Foundation Award

References

External links 

 Forthcoming in New Dictionary of Scientific Biography

1917 births
1986 deaths
American biochemists
American science writers
American textbook writers
Medical educators
Science teachers
People from Bridgeport, Connecticut
Wesleyan University alumni
University of Wisconsin–Madison alumni
University of Wisconsin–Madison faculty
University of Chicago faculty
Members of the United States National Academy of Sciences
20th-century American male writers
20th-century American non-fiction writers
American male non-fiction writers
Members of the National Academy of Medicine
Members of the American Philosophical Society